The Stutthof trials were a series of war crime tribunals held in postwar Poland for the prosecution of Stutthof concentration camp staff and officials, responsible for the murder of up to 85,000 prisoners during the occupation of Poland by Nazi Germany in World War II. None of the Stutthof commandants were ever tried in Poland. SS-Sturmbannführer Max Pauly was put on trial by a British military court in Germany but not for the crimes committed at Stutthof; only as the commandant of the Neuengamme concentration camp in Hamburg. Nevertheless, Pauly was executed in 1946.

The first Polish war crimes tribunal was convened at Gdańsk, Poland, from April 25, 1946 to May 31, 1946. The next three trials took place at the same court in October 8–31, 1947, November 5–10, and in November 19–29 of that year. The fifth trial was held before the court in Toruń in 1949. The sixth and the last Stutthof trial in Poland took place in 1953 also in Gdańsk. In total, of the approximately 2,000 SS men and women who ran the entire camp complex, 72 SS officers and six female overseers were brought to justice.

First Stutthof trial
During the first trial held at Gdańsk from April 25, 1946, to May 31, 1946, the joint Soviet/Polish Special Criminal Court tried and convicted of crimes against humanity a group of thirteen ex-officials and overseers of the Stutthof concentration camp in Sztutowo and its Bromberg-Ost subcamp for women located in the city of Bydgoszcz. The accused were arraigned before the court and all found guilty. Twelve were sentenced to death, including the commander of the guards Johann Pauls, while the remainder were sentenced to various terms of imprisonment. The death sentences were carried out on July 4, 1946 at the Biskupia Górka in Gdańsk, by short-drop hanging.

The commandant of the Stutthof and Neuengamme concentration camps SS-Sturmbannführer Max Pauly was sentenced to death in Germany at about the same time. Pauly was tried by the British for war crimes with thirteen others in the Curio Haus in Hamburg which was located in the British occupied sector of Germany. The trial lasted from March 18, 1946 to May 13, 1946. He was found guilty and sentenced to death with 11 other defendants. He was executed by long-drop hanging by Albert Pierrepoint in Hamelin Prison on October 8, 1946. The second commandant SS-Sturmbannführer Paul-Werner Hoppe (August 1942 - January 1945) was apprehended in 1953 in West Germany and later sentenced to nine years imprisonment.

Verdicts in the first Stutthof trial
 Johann Pauls, SS Oberscharführer: Death, executed: July 4, 1946
 Jenny-Wanda Barkmann, SS Aufseherin: Death, executed: July 4, 1946
 Elisabeth Becker, SS Aufseherin: Death, executed: July 4, 1946
 Wanda Klaff, SS Aufseherin: Death, executed: July 4, 1946
 Ewa Paradies, SS Aufseherin Death, executed: July 4, 1946
 Gerda Steinhoff, SS Blockleiterin: Death, executed: July 4, 1946
 Erna Beilhardt, SS Aufseherin: 5 years imprisonment
 Tadeusz Kopczynski, (Kapo): Death, executed: July 4, 1946
 Waclaw Kozlowski, Kapo: Death, executed: July 4, 1946
 Jozef Reiter, Kapo: Death, executed: July 4, 1946
 Fanciszek Szopinski, Kapo: Death, executed: July 4, 1946
 Kazimierz Kowalski, Kapo: 3 years imprisonment
 Jan Brajt, Kapo: Death, executed: July 4, 1946
 Aleksy Duzdal, Kapo: Not guilty
 Jan Preiss, Kapo: Not guilty
 Marian Zielkowski, Kapo: Died of a heart attack in prison, August 25, 1945

Second Stutthof trial
The second trial was held from October 8, 1947, to October 31, 1947, before a Polish Special Criminal Court. Arraigned 24 ex-officials and guards of the Stutthof concentration camp were judged and found guilty. Ten were sentenced to death.

Verdicts in the second trial

Nine SS men and the Kapo Nikolaysen were executed on October 28, 1948:
 Kurt Dietrich, SS Unterscharführer: Death, executed: October 28, 1948
 Karl Eggert, SS Rottenführer: Death, executed: October 28, 1948
 Theodor Meyer, SS Hauptsturmführer: Death, executed: October 28, 1948
 Ewald Foth, SS Oberscharführer: Death, executed: October 28, 1948
 Albert Paulitz, SS Oberscharführer: Death, executed: October 28, 1948
 Fritz Peters, SS Unterscharführer: Death, executed: October 28, 1948
 Hans Rach, SS Oberscharführer: Death, executed: October 28, 1948
 Paul Wellnitz, SS Rottenführer: Death, executed: October 28, 1948
 Karl Zurell, SS Rottenführer: Death, executed: October 28, 1948
 Erich Thun, SS Unterscharführer: Life imprisonment
 Wilhelm Vogler, SS Hauptsturmführer: 15 years imprisonment
 Eduard Zerlin, SS Unterscharführer: 12 years imprisonment
 Oskar Gottchau, SS Unterscharführer: 10 years imprisonment
 Adolf Grams, SS Rottenführer: 10 years imprisonment
 Emil Wenzel, SS Unterscharführer: 10 years imprisonment
 Werner Wöllnitz, SS Rottenführer: 10 years imprisonment
 Johannes Görtz, SS Unterscharführer: 8 years imprisonment
 Karl Reger, SS Scharführer: 8 years imprisonment
 Martin Stage, SS Scharführer: 8 years imprisonment
 Adalbert Wolter, SS Unterscharführer: 8 years imprisonment
 Josef Wennhardt, SS Scharführer: 8 years imprisonment
 Hugo Ziehm, SS Scharführer: 3 years imprisonment
 Walter Englert, SS Scharführer: 3 years imprisonment
 Alfred Nikolaysen, Kapo: Death, executed: October 28, 1948

Third Stutthof trial
The third trial was held from November 5, 1947, to November 10, 1947, before a Polish Special Criminal Court. Arraigned 20 ex-officials and guards were judged; nineteen were found guilty, and one was acquitted.

Verdicts in the third trial
 Karl Meinck, SS Obersturmführer: 12 years imprisonment
 Gustav Eberle, SS Hauptscharführer: 10 years imprisonment
 Erich Jassen, SS Hauptscharführer: 10 years imprisonment
 Adolf Klaffke, SS Oberscharführer: 10 years imprisonment
 Otto Schneider, SS Unterscharführer: 10 years imprisonment
 Otto Welke, SS Sturmscharführer: 10 years imprisonment
 Willy Witt, SS Unterscharführer: 10 years imprisonment
 Alfred Tissler, SS Rottenführer: 5 years imprisonment
 Johann Lichtner, SS Hauptscharführer: 5 years imprisonment
 Ernst Thulke, SS Rottenführer: 5 years imprisonment
 Heinz Löwen, SS Scharführer: 5 years imprisonment
 Erich Stampniok, SS Unterscharführer: 5 years imprisonment
 Hans Möhrke, SS Sturmscharführer: 4 years imprisonment
 Harry Müller, SS Unterscharführer: 4 years imprisonment
 Richard Timm, SS Hauptscharführer: 4 years imprisonment
 Nikolaus Dirnberger, SS Scharführer: 4 years imprisonment
 Friedrich Tessmer, SS Scharführer: 4 years imprisonment
 Johann Sporer, SS Unterscharführer: 4 years imprisonment
 Nikolai Klawan, SS Scharführer: 3 years imprisonment
 Hans Tolksdorf, SS Oberscharführer: Not guilty

Fourth Stutthof trial
The fourth trial was also held before a Polish Special Criminal Court, from November 19, 1947, to November 29, 1947. Arraigned 27 ex-officials and guards were judged; 26 were found guilty, and one was acquitted.

Verdicts in the fourth trial
 Willi Buth, SS Hauptscharführer: Death, executed: January 10, 1949
 Albert Weckmüller, SS Hauptsturmführer: 15 years imprisonment
 Rudolf Berg, SS Scharführer: 10 years imprisonment
 Fritz Glawe, SS Unterscharführer: 10 years imprisonment
 Horst Köpke, SS Unterscharführer: 10 years imprisonment
 Emil Lascheit, SS Sturmscharführer: 10 years imprisonment
 Kurt Reduhn, SS Unterscharführer: 10 years imprisonment
 Josef Stahl, SS Unterscharführer: 10 years imprisonment
 Waldemar Henke, SS Obersturmführer: 5 years imprisonment
 Gustav Kautz, SS Unterscharführer: 5 years imprisonment
 Hermann Link, SS Scharführer: 5 years imprisonment
 Erich Mertens, SS Oberscharführer: 5 years imprisonment
 Martin Pentz, SS Scharführer: 5 years imprisonment
 Johann Pfister, SS Rottenführer: 5 years imprisonment
 Johannes Wall, SS Sturmscharführer: 5 years imprisonment
 Richard Akolt, SS Rottenführer: 3 years imprisonment
 Anton Kniffke, SS Scharführer: 3 years imprisonment
 Christof Schwarz, SS Hauptsturmführer: 3 years imprisonment
 Gustav Brodowski, SS Rottenführer: 7 months' imprisonment
 Walter Ringewald, SS Oberscharfuhrer: 7 months' imprisonment
 Richard Wohlfeil, SS Hauptscharführer: 7 months' imprisonment
 Johann Wrobel, SS Oberscharführer: 7 months' imprisonment
 Ernst Knappert, SS Rottenführer: 7 months' imprisonment
 Bernard Eckermann, SS Oberscharführer: 7 months' imprisonment
 Leopold Baumgartner, SS Oberscharführer: 7 months' imprisonment
 Emil Paul, SS Unterscharführer: 7 months' imprisonment
 Franz Spillmann, Kapo: Not guilty

Fifth and sixth trials
The last two trials in Poland concerning two Stutthof concentration camp officials took place four years apart. In 1949, SS-Hauptsturmführer Hans Jacobi, the commandant of Stutthof subcamps forming Baukommando Weichsel or OT Thorn (Organisation Todt Thorn) for women digging anti-tank ditches, was tried before the criminal court in Toruń and sentenced to three years in prison.

In 1953 the court in Gdańsk tried SS-man  Bielawa (SS Rottenführer Paul Bielawa, a prisoner guard from the 3rd company in Stutthof between 1941–45) and sentenced him to twelve years. SS-Rottenführer Emil Strehlau was sentenced by the court in Torun (Wloclawek) on April 23, 1948, to death for war crimes. He was executed November 8 in Wloclawek

Later trials

In 2017, the prosecution of two former Stutthof camp guards from Borken and Wuppertal commenced. The Wuppertal accused denied the allegations and declared that he was not present during the killings, and did not notice anything about it.

In November 2018, Johann Rehbogen from Borken was tried in court for serving at Stutthof camp from June 1942 to September 1944. In December 2018, the trial was suspended, since the convict had to be hospitalized for serious heart and kidney problems. On February 25, 2019, it was announced that the trial is unlikely to be restarted due to the poor health conditions of the defendant.

In October 2019, Bruno Dey from Hamburg was accused of contributing to the killings of 5,230 prisoners at Stutthof camp between 1944 and 1945. However, he was tried in a juvenile court due to being about 17 at that time. In July 2020, he was convicted of 5,232 counts of accessory to murder by the Hamburg state court, and was also convicted of one count of accessory to attempted murder.

In 2021, Irmgard Furchner a German former concentration camp secretary and stenographer at Stutthof, where she worked for camp commandant Paul-Werner Hoppe, was charged with 11,412 counts of accessory to murder and 18 additional counts of accessory to attempted murder, On December 20, 2022 she was found guilty and sentenced to a suspended jail term of two years.

See also
 Nuremberg trials of the 23 most important leaders of the Third Reich, 1945–1946
 Dachau trials held within the walls of the former Dachau concentration camp, 1945–1948
 Sobibór trial held in Hagen, Germany in 1965, concerning the Sobibór extermination camp
 Belzec trial before the 1st Munich District Court in the mid-1960s, eight SS-men of the Bełżec extermination camp
 Majdanek trials, the longest Nazi war crimes trial in history, spanning over 30 years
 Chełmno trials of the Chełmno extermination camp personnel, held in Poland and in Germany. The cases were decided almost twenty years apart

References

 Several authors,  Monografia KL Stutthof (KL Stutthof monograph) (Internet Archive). Organization, Prisoners, Subcamps, Extermination, Responsibility. Contributing writers: Bogdan Chrzanowski, Konrad Ciechanowski, Danuta Drywa, Ewa Ferenc, Andrzej Gąsiorowski, Mirosław Gliński, Janina Grabowska, Elżbieta Grot, Marek Orski, and Krzysztof Steyer.

External links

 
Holocaust trials
Poland–Soviet Union relations
Trials in Poland